Kerala State Drugs and Pharmaceutical Limited (KSDP) is an enterprise fully owned by Government of Kerala for manufacturing essential and life-saving medicines primarily to cater the needs of Government hospitals in the State. Alongside its primary objective, K.S.D.P exports drugs to other Indian states and also supplies to the Jan Oushadi.                 Now  the Company is a major supplier of Quality drugs to Kerala State Medical Service Corporation ( KMSCL ).']. K.S.D.P was established in the year 1974 and is situated in Kalavoor, Alappuzha.

Accreditation 
The company received  Good manufacturing practice (GMP) approval for its manufacturing facility from the World Health Organization. This would enable K.S.D.P to supply medicines to countries that follow quality standard based on GMP under the brand name of Kerala Generics. These countries include African nations such as Ghana, Kenya and Zimbabwe, and Asian countries like Cambodia.

Activities

COVID-19 pandemic
During the COVID-19 pandemic in India in 2020, K.S.D.P was given order to manufacture One Lakh units of Hand Sanitizers by the Kerala Government for supply to the general public at cheaper rates.

See also 
Public sector undertakings in Kerala

References 

1974 establishments in Kerala
Pharmaceutical companies of India
Prevention in India
Government-owned companies of Kerala
Pharmaceutical companies established in 1974
Indian companies established in 1974